Dan S. Budd (February 26, 1927 - September 9, 2015) was an American politician in the state of Wyoming. He served in the Wyoming House of Representatives as a member of the Republican Party. He attended Utah State University and is a rancher.

References

1927 births
2015 deaths
People from Sublette County, Wyoming
University of Utah alumni
Ranchers from Wyoming
Republican Party members of the Wyoming House of Representatives